Heather W. MacAllister (born Texas, United States) is a writer of over 40 romance novels since 1990, principally as Heather MacAllister. She has also signed her novels as Heather Allison.

Her award-winning romance novels have been translated into 25 languages and published in dozens of countries.

Biography
MacAllister was born in Texas and is married to her high-school sweetheart. She became addicted to romance novels in college, yet still managed to graduate and become a music teacher. She began to write while their children grew. She sold her first novel in December 1989.

She lives with her husband and their children in Texas.

Bibliography

As Heather Allison

Single novels
Deck The Halls (1990)
Pulse Points (1991)
Jack Of Hearts (1992)
Ivy's League (1993)
The Santa Sleuth (1994)
Counterfeit Cowgirl (1994)
Undercover Lover (1995)
Temporary Texan (1996)
His Cinderella Bride (1996)
Marry Me (1997)
Haunted Spouse (1997)
Marry In Haste (1997)

Collections
3 Titles By Heather Allison; Marry Me / Undercover Lover / Deck the Halls (2001)

As Heather MacAllister

Proyect: Belden Series
Jilt Trip (1995)
Bedded Bliss (1996)

Wrong Bed Series Multi-Author
Bedded Bliss (1996)

Single novels
Christmas Male (1996)
Bride Overboard (1997)
Long Southern Nights (1997)
Manhunting in Memphis (1998)
Mr. December (1998)
The Boss and the Plain Jayne Bride (1999)
Indomptable Sirene (1999)
Moonlighting (2000)
Personal Relations (2001)
How to Be the Perfect Girlfriend (2004)
Never Say Never (2005)
Lone Star Santa (2006)
Undressed (2009)
A Man for All Seasons (2010)
Tall, Dark & Restless (2012)

Texas Grooms Wanted Series
Hand-Picked Husband (1998)

Bachelor Territory Series Multi-Author
The Bachelor and the Babies (1998)

Bachelors and Babies Series Multi-Author
The Good, the Bad and the Cuddly (1999)

Bachelor Auction Series Multi-Author
The Rancher and the Rich Girl (1999)

Project: Pregnancy Series
The Paternity Plan (2000)
The Motherhood Campaign (2000)

Cooper's Corner Series Multi-Author
After Darke (2002)

Single In The City Series Multi-Author
Tempted in Texas (2002)
Skirting the Issue (2002)
Male Call (2003)

Spirits are Willing Series
Can't Buy Me Love (2004)

24 Hours the Wedding Series Multi-Author
Falling for You: 24 Hours (2005)

Omnibus in collaboration
Temptations Blaze (1998) (with Elda Minger and JoAnn Ross)
Escapade (2000) (with Muriel Jensen, Kelsey Roberts and Deborah Simmons) (Mommy On Board, Unspoken Confessions, Bride Overboard, the Squire's Daughter)
Deck the Halls (2000) (with Margot Early)
Home on the Range (2001) (with Margot Early) (Christmas Male / The Truth about Cowboys)
Tyler Brides (2001) (with Jacqueline Diamond and Kristine Rolofson)
Cut to the Chase / How to be the Perfect Girlfriend (2004) (with Julie Kistler)
Can't Buy Me Love / I Shocked the Sheriff (2004) (with Mara Fox)
Good Night, Gracie / Never Say Never (2005) (with Kristin Gabriel)
Bootcamp (2006) (with Leslie Kelly and Cindi Myers)

References and sources
Heather MacAllister's Official Website
Heather MacAllister at eHarlequin
Heather MacAllister at Mills & Boon's
Heather MacAllister's Webpage at Fantastic Fiction

20th-century American novelists
21st-century American novelists
American romantic fiction writers
Year of birth missing (living people)
Living people
American women novelists
Women romantic fiction writers
20th-century American women writers
21st-century American women writers